

League notes
MJHL announced that each team will play six interlocking games against teams in the TBJHL as part of the regular season.

Regular season

Playoffs
Turnbull Cup Championship
Monarchs lost to St. Boniface 4-games-to-none
Western Memorial Cup Semi-Final
St. Boniface lost to Port Arthur North Stars  (TBJHL) 4-games-to-2

Awards

All-Star Teams

References
Manitoba Junior Hockey League
Manitoba Hockey Hall of Fame
Hockey Hall of Fame
Winnipeg Free Press Archives
Brandon Sun Archives

MJHL
Manitoba Junior Hockey League seasons